Gainsborough Dupont (20 December 1754 – 20 January 1797) was a British artist, the nephew and pupil of Thomas Gainsborough, R.A.

Biography

Dupont was born in Sudbury, Suffolk, on 20 December 1754
the eldest son of Thomas Gainsborough's sister Sarah, and her husband Philip Dupont. In 1772 he was apprenticed to Gainsborough, for whom he  continued to work until the latter's death in 1788. He was the only assistant Gainsborough is ever known to have employed. He also trained at the Royal Academy Schools, where he became a student in  March 1775.

Dupont took over Gainsborough's studio in Schomberg House in 1788, and moved to Bloomsbury in 1793, following the death of Gainsborough's widow.
He painted portraits and landscapes in a style of  similar to that of his uncle, and also landscapes with architectural ruins, in which he imitated Nicolas Poussin. His principal work is a large picture containing the portraits of the elder brethren of Trinity House, which is in their court-room on Tower Hill.

Prints
From 1779 onwards, Dupont made a series of mezzotints after Gainsborough's portraits. They include:
George III., full length.
Queen Charlotte, full length.
The Princess Royal, and the Princesses Augusta and Elizabeth, full length.
George, Lord Rodney, full length.
General Conway, full length.
Colonel St. Leger, full length.
Rev. Sir Henry Bate Dudley, Bart..
Rev. Richard Graves, half-length, oval.

Death
Dupont died in London on 20 January 1797, aged 42. He was buried in Kew churchyard in the same grave as Thomas Gainsborough.

Works

References

Sources

External links
 

1754 births
1797 deaths
18th-century English painters
English male painters
English engravers
English portrait painters
Thomas Gainsborough